Prelude and Fugue in C sharp Major, BWV 848, is a keyboard composition written by Johann Sebastian Bach. It is the third prelude and fugue in the first book of The Well-Tempered Clavier, a series of 48 preludes and fugues by the composer.

Analysis

Prelude

The prelude is a lively 2 part texture, using a series of broken chords which swap between the hands. It is in  a fast 3/8 time signature and is made up largely of semiquavers. Later on in the piece, the semiquaver line splits between the hands before ending with a short Coda in an improvisatory manner.

Fugue

The three-voice fugue is unusually void of the commonly used fugal devices, such as augmentation, diminution, inversion, pedal point or stretti. The cheerful subject is characterised by descending broken 6ths in light quavers. One of the countersubjects is constructed with running legato semiquavers, whilst the other consists of longer note values. The fugue has an extensive sequential episode which develops through related keys before the reappearance of the three voices.

References
 Bach Digital Work  at

External links

Interactive media
BWV 848 Fugue (Flash) - David Korevaar performing
BWV 846-869 Prelude and Fugue (Flash) at the BinAural Collaborative Hypertext  David Korevaar, Philip Goeth, and Edward Parmentier performing

Sheet Music
 

The Well-Tempered Clavier
Compositions in C-sharp major